Bo Henriksen (born 7 February 1975) is a Danish football coach and former player. He is the current head coach of Swiss Super League side FC Zürich. 

Henriksen rose to prominence as a striker in both his home country, where he won the 1999–2000 Danish Superliga with Herfølge, as well as in England, where he played in the Football League with Kidderminster Harriers.

Playing career 
Henriksen, famed for his long locks of blonde hair began his career as a footballer with Danish team Odense Boldklub (OB), whom he joined in 1994 as a youth player from OKS. Despite scoring regularly in his first three years at the club, he fell out of the starting line-up under new OB manager Roald Poulsen, but scored 10 goals in five reserve team matches. He left in January 1998 to join fellow Danish Superliga club Herfølge Boldklub. He became, and remained, a regular fixture in their team for the next three years, scoring 14 goals in 69 league appearances. He scored a single goal during the 1999–2000 season, in which Herfølge most surprisingly won the Danish championship.

As Herfølge struggled economically, Henriksen was loaned out to English club Kidderminster Harriers in November 2001. Henriksen first appeared for Kidderminster in a reserve-team fixture against Wigan Athletic two weeks prior to the deal being signed, and he made his official first-team debut just one day after joining the club, in a fixture against Leyton Orient. He scored a goal as a substitute in the match that Kidderminster won 3–1. He quickly became a firm favourite with the club's fans, and scored eight more times in the 2001–02 season. He was bought by Kidderminster's Danish manager Jan Mølby in a £12,500 transfer deal in February 2002.

Somewhat ironically, his career at the club only really took off after his mentor Jan Mølby parted company with the club in 2002. Henriksen will fondly be remembered in Kidderminster for breaking all kinds of records during the club's short five-year stay in the Football League. He became the first, and to date only, player to score three goals in a Football League game for the team as Kidderminster beat Exeter City 5–2 in late 2002. He ended the 2002–03 season as the club's highest-ever Football League goal scorer, with 20 goals in 41 appearances. He went on to score two goals in the first match of the following season against Mansfield Town in August 2003, but failed to score again in his Kidderminster career despite remaining one of their most popular footballers.

Affectionately known as "Bomber Bo", he left Kidderminster and joined Bristol Rovers in March 2004, and returned home to Denmark to play for Køge Boldklub a few months later. Henriksen moved abroad again in June 2005, to play for Valur and Fram Reykjavik in Iceland, as well as Victory SC in the Maldives. He failed to agree financial terms with English non-league side AFC Telford United in March 2006, and moved on to Icelandic club ÍBV.

Managerial career
Bo Henriksen was a successful player/manager and later manager of Brønshøj Boldklub from 2007, getting the club promoted to the second best league (Danish 1st Division) in 2010 and maintaining them in the top half of the league for a handful of seasons, until he left for AC Horsens in 2014. He managed Horsens for six years, until he left by mutual consent in August 2020.

On 31 May 2021, Henriksen was named the new manager of FC Midtjylland, replacing Brian Priske, who led the team to the 2019-20 Danish Superliga title and had moved to a coaching position at Royal Antwerp.

Henriksen has been released of his managerial duties at FC Midtjylland as of 28 July 2022, according to an official statement published on Twitter.

On 10 October 2022, he was confirmed as the new head coach of FC Zürich. He signed a contract until summer 2024 with the defending Swiss champions, who found themselves at the bottom of the league after ten games played, at the time of his Henriksen's assignment.

Managerial statistics

Honours
Herfølge
 Danish Superliga: 2000
 Player of the Year: 2001

Victory SC
Maldives President's Cup: 2005

References

External links
 Bo Henriksen Interview
Soccerbase career statistics
 Boldklubben Frem profile

1975 births
Living people
People from Roskilde
Danish men's footballers
Danish football managers
Odense Boldklub players
Herfølge Boldklub players
Boldklubben Frem players
Kidderminster Harriers F.C. players
Bristol Rovers F.C. players
Køge Boldklub players
Valur (men's football) players
Knattspyrnufélagið Fram players
Íþróttabandalag Vestmannaeyja players
Brønshøj Boldklub players
Danish Superliga players
Danish expatriate men's footballers
Danish expatriate sportspeople in England
Expatriate footballers in England
Danish expatriate sportspeople in Iceland
Expatriate footballers in Iceland
Expatriate footballers in the Maldives
Victory Sports Club players
Brønshøj BK managers
Association football forwards
Danish Superliga managers
AC Horsens managers
FC Midtjylland managers
FC Zürich managers
Odense Kammeraternes Sportsklub players
Sportspeople from Region Zealand